"Be True to Your School" is a song by American rock band the Beach Boys from their 1963 album Little Deuce Coupe. Written by Brian Wilson and Mike Love, it was issued as a single October 28, 1963. There are two versions of this song: the album version, and the single version, which added cheerleader yells by Honeys in between verses.  The song features the melody of the University of Wisconsin's fight song, "On, Wisconsin!", although it is a tribute to Hawthorne High School, which the Wilson brothers attended. Hawthorne High School's fight song uses the same melody as "On Wisconsin".

The cover photo for this single (and for the associated album Little Deuce Coupe) included member David Marks but not Al Jardine, though Jardine had returned to create a six-member band for the recording sessions for this single and album.  This single, with its B-side "In My Room", were the last two of eight charting Beach Boys songs to include Marks in the 1960s.

Chart history

Weekly charts

Year-end charts

Covers and later versions

1964 – The Knights, Hot Rod High
1985 – Jan & Dean, Silver Summer.

In popular culture
 The song is featured in an episode of Gilmore Girls, where the town troubadour (portrayed by Grant-Lee Phillips) is playing it during a pep rally.
 DTV, in 1984, set the original Beach Boys version of the song to a collection of Disney shorts including some featuring schools like Toot, Whistle, Plunk and Boom and The Legend of Sleepy Hollow.
 The song is played during the title sequence of the 1988 dark comedy Mortuary Academy.
 The song's title is parodied by heavy metal band Twisted Sister in the song "Be Crool to Your Scuel".
 Mike Love performed the song on a telethon on the Full House episode "Our Very First Telethon"; while the title of a later episode, "Be True to Your Preschool", is a reference to the song.
 The song is featured in the 1980s TV series Riptide. The song is also the title of the episode (season 2, episode 7).
 The song inspired the Ripped Pants song from the SpongeBob SquarePants episode "Ripped Pants”.
 The song was part of an oldies melody in the 2005 Tokyo Disneyland parade/show "Disney's Rock Around the Mouse".
 The song is featured in the end credits of the HBO series Vice Principals, season 1, episode 1.
 Grace Vanderwaal sings the song in the 2020 Disney+ movie Stargirl. It is also included on the soundtrack for the movie.
 The song was featured on a 1993 Sony Kids' Music album called Camp California, Where the Music Never Ends.
 The song was used in a Macy's contest and commercial in 2014.

References

External links
 

1963 songs
1963 singles
The Beach Boys songs
Jan and Dean songs
Songs written by Brian Wilson
Songs written by Mike Love
Song recordings produced by Brian Wilson
Capitol Records singles
Songs about school